Ira Cook (October 6, 1821 - March 11, 1902) was an American surveyor, mayor, banker, tax collector, city council member, investor and entrepreneur from Des Moines, Iowa.

Background 
Ira Cook was born October 6, 1821 in the Town of Union, Broome County, New York. His father, one sister and her husband moved to Iowa in 1835 and settled on land in what is now Davenport. Ira and the remainder of his family moved to Iowa in the spring of 1836. He lived in Tipton, Iowa from 1838-1941, working on the family farm and having the chance to meet then Iowa Territorial Governor Robert Lucas.

Early career 
In 1849, he teamed with John Evans on a contract which began his four-plus year career as a government surveyor. After leaving his surveying career and Davenport, Cook moved to Des Moines in 1855 and entered the banking business with the firm of Cook, Sargent & Cook.

He married Mary C. Owens on April 25, 1854. He and his wife were given a three-year-old girl to care for by the child's father in 1857. Fearful that they might lose the child due to provisions in her father's will, Cook consulted with John A. Kasson, then practicing law in Des Moines. Together they drafted a bill concerning the adoption of children in Iowa. When the bill passed, the Cooks promptly adopted the little girl, raising her as their own. Mary gave birth to a daughter of their own on June 5, 1859, Rachel Faxton Cook and their second child was Carrie L. Cook.

Mayoralty, Washington and return 
He was elected Mayor of Des Moines, Iowa in 1861 and resigned not long after. Beginning in 1860 he engaged in insurance and real estate with C. C. Dawson. He moved to Washington D.C. in 1862 and assumed a position in the Post Office Department. He took a position as a Deputy United States Revenue Collector in 1864. In 1866, he moved back to Des Moines and was elected to two terms on the City Council.

Investments 
In 1875, he became a stockholder in the Iowa Loan and Trust Company, one of the most important financial institutions in the State of Iowa at the time. In 1880, he was elected one of Iowa Loan and Trust Companies trustees. In 1896, he partnered with G. M. Hippee and others to form the Des Moines Syrup Refining Company, which operated to make syrup, sugar, and glucose from corn.

Cook wrote a number of articles that were published in different newspapers in the state. He wrote "Government Surveying in Early Iowa", published in the January 1897, issue of The Annals of Iowa.

Death 
He died March 11, 1902 and was buried in Woodland Cemetery in Des Moines. Visitors to the State Historical Museum in Des Moines will find Ira Cook featured in the “You Gotta Know the Territory” exhibit.

Mary C. Owens Cook was born November 6, 1831, and died March 7, 1918. She was interred beside Ira at Woodland Cemetery.

References

1821 births
1902 deaths
American bankers
Burials at Woodland Cemetery (Des Moines, Iowa)
Businesspeople from Iowa
Iowa city council members
Mayors of Des Moines, Iowa
People from Broome County, New York
Politicians from Davenport, Iowa
People from Tipton, Iowa
19th-century American politicians
19th-century American businesspeople